Manku Dinne (Kannada: ಮಂಕು ದಿಣ್ಣೆ) is a 1968 Indian Kannada film, directed by K. S. L. Swamy and produced by A. M. Sameevulla. The film stars Kalyan Kumar, B. Vijayalakshmi, Balakrishna and B. Jayashree in the lead roles. The film has musical score by Vijaya Bhaskar.

Cast

Kalyan Kumar
B. Vijayalakshmi
Balakrishna
M. Jayashree
Dinesh
Shylashri
Narasimharaju
Jr. Revathi
Dwarakish
B. V. Radha
M. Srinivas
Akhthar
Humayun
H. M. T. Sathya
Sathyanarayana
Asad

Soundtrack
The music was composed by Vijaya Bhaskar.

References

External links
 
 

1968 films
1960s Kannada-language films
Films scored by Vijaya Bhaskar
Films directed by K. S. L. Swamy